Parekoy (Buddy) is a Philippine television sitcom on ABS-CBN from January 5 to April 17, 2009, and was replaced by Kambal sa Uma.
Parekoy is about the misadventures of friends Jess (Jason Gainza), Joseph (John Prats) and Mario (Zanjoe Marudo) and how they think up ingenuous ways to help people in need. Their roles came from the characters they played on now defunct show, Aalog-Alog.

Synopsis
Follow the crazy adventures of the PA-pabol waiter Mario (Zanjoe Marudo), the RE-sponsibol nurse Joseph (John Prats), and the KOY-abol messenger Jess (Jayson Gainza) as their friendship keep them together through the tough times. Will the playboy and homophobic Mario be shocked to find out his father's true identity? Can Joseph handle being a good brother to his three sexy younger sisters? For how long will Jess put up with his domineering wife? What long-kept secret will test the brotherly bond of the three?

Cast

Main cast
Jason Gainza as Jess
John Prats as Joseph
Zanjoe Marudo as Mario

Supporting and guest casts
Angelu de Leon as Angelique (special participation)
Maria Isabel Lopez as Mother Divine
Tetchie Agbayani as Lucy
Roy Alvarez as Benjamin
Dennis Padilla as Bart
Raymund Concepcion as Henry
Kitkat as  Sharon/Shawie
Leandro Baldemor as BIGBOSS/Mayor Banal
Israel Carreon as Younger Mario
Ronald Jaimeer Humarang as Younger Jess
Christian Mercado as Younger Joseph
Kristofer Dangculos as Younger Ringo/Ringo Jr.
Aria Clemente as Hilary
Diamond Dela Cruz
Reginald Marquez as Jules
Bobby Andrews as Paul
Long Mejia as Boss Goodie
Charee Pineda as Toni
Michelle Carbonell
Sharlene San Pedro as Fatima
Igi Boy Flores as Angelito
Jacq Yu as Britney
Giselle Sanchez as Glenda
Irma Adlawan as Ema
Olive Cortez as Rachelle
Empress Schuck as Maricorn
Dawn Jimenez (as Dawn Balagot) as Nikka
Bodie Cruz
Jaymee Joaquin as Beverly and Lyka Biscotti
Janna Dominguez as Ligaya
Joy Viado as Bart's friend
Bam Romana as George
James Blanco as Ting Pao Jr.

See also
Yu-Gi-Oh Gx
Aalog-Alog
List of programs broadcast by ABS-CBN

References

External links
Parekoy Pare Koy drama

ABS-CBN original programming
Television series by Dreamscape Entertainment Television
Philippine television sitcoms
2009 Philippine television series debuts
2009 Philippine television series endings
Filipino-language television shows